The Peter Furler Band is a Christian rock band from both Australia and the United States. It started in 2012 by Furler, and the band released their first album Sun and Shield in 2014 on their independent label New Day Christian Records and Platinum Pop Records.

Background 

The band started in January 2012 by former Newsboys frontman Peter Furler joining with Dave Ghazarian formerly of Audio Adrenaline and Superchick, Jeff Irizarry, and Phil Joel formerly of the Newsboys.  Joel left, however, shortly after its formation. The band released its debut studio album, Sun and Shield, on March 11, 2014, through their own, independent label, New Day Christian Records and Platinum Pop Records. The album charted on Billboard Christian Albums and Independent Albums charts.

Discography

Studio albums

References

External links
 
 CCM Magazine Magazine story

Musical groups established in 2012